George Henry Gause, Jr. (died in 1986) was a mortician and politician from Florida. He served as mayor of Bartow, Florida. and also served as a commissioner. He was an African American and was named as a Great Floridian. He also served on the Polk County School Board.

Gause's father was a naval architect and had a funeral home in Wilmington, North Carolina before moving to Florida for health reasons. Gause Jr. went to  Union Academy High School in Bartow.

He served two terms as Bartow's mayor from 1971 to 1977.

Gause was interviewed in 1975, for the Button Project.

There is a George H. Gause Elementary school located in Bartow, Florida, while two streets are named after him. The Martin Luther King Day celebration in Bartow honors him in its name. In 2002, he was inducted into the Polk County Public Schools Hall of Fame.

References

Year of birth missing
1986 deaths
Mayors of places in Florida
African-American mayors in Florida